An Lanntair is an arts centre in the town of Stornoway in the Outer Hebrides of Scotland. The centre is home to a cinema, and art gallery. Previously located in the Town Hall, An Lanntair moved to its current new building overlooking the harbour in September 2005. This building features a 50-seater restaurant, art gallery, shop, and auditorium seating over two hundred. The auditorium houses the first cinema in Stornoway since 1995.

An Lanntair is the principal venue for arts and entertainment events in Stornoway and regularly hosts performances by musicians as well as plays, talks, and films. It is a key venue for the annual Hebridean Celtic Festival, and has hosted events for the Royal National Mòd in 2005 and 2011.

Its name is Gaelic for the lantern.

The Arts and entertainment 
 Exhibitions
 Live events
 Cinema
 Workshops and education
 Shop
 Conferences

Food Facilities 
 Restaurant
 Café bar
 Special Functions

External links
 An Lanntair

Lanntair
Lanntair
Tourist attractions in the Outer Hebrides
Cinemas in Scotland
2005 establishments in Scotland
Buildings and structures completed in 2005
Theatres in Scotland
Stornoway
Arts organisations based in Scotland